The Capetian–Plantagenet rivalry was a series of conflicts and disputes that covered a period of 100 years (1159–1259) during which the House of Capet, rulers of the Kingdom of France, fought the House of Plantagenet (also known as the House of Anjou), rulers of the Kingdom of England, to suppress the growing power of the Plantagenet-controlled Angevin Empire. Some historians refer to this series of events as the "First Hundred Years' War".

The continental possessions of the Kings of England were considered to be more important than their insular ones, covering an area significantly greater than the territories controlled by the Kings of France who, however, were the overlords of the former. The conflict was primarily French from 1159 as:
 both dynasties were French
 the nobles who made up the English army were essentially of French origin, with a few foreigners
 the foot soldiers of the English king were local recruits in France (Anjou, Guyenne, Normandy, Brittany etc.)

The rivalry between the two dynasties and the many wars that came with it led to the gradual "reconquest" by the Capetians of most of their own kingdom. Indeed, while their nominal suzerainty extended far beyond the small domain of Île-de-France, the actual power they held over many of their vassals was weak. After the conflict ended with the Treaty of Paris in 1259, the English kings, through their few remaining possessions on the continent, would remain vassals to the French kings until the Treaty of Brétigny in 1360.

The expansionary policy of Henry II
In 1150, Henry II received the Duchy of Normandy from his father Geoffrey V, Count of Anjou, and when he died in 1151, he became Count of Anjou and Maine.

On May 18, 1152, he became Duke of Aquitaine in right of his wife by marrying Eleanor of Aquitaine in Poitiers after her first marriage with the King of France Louis VII the Younger was annulled at the Council of Beaugency. Several children were born of this marriage.

On November 6, 1153, by the Treaty of Wallingford (or Treaty of Winchester), he was recognized as the successor of King Stephen of England (Stephen of Blois before his accession to the throne). When the latter died on October 25, 1154, he ascended the throne of England under the name of Henry II. On Sunday, December 19, he was crowned at Westminster Abbey.

Henry introduced some religious and legislative reforms. In 1155, he appointed Thomas Becket chancellor.

In 1156, he seized the viscounty of Thouars, thereby controlling communications between the northwest and south-west France.

In 1159, continuing his expansionist policy, he besieged Toulouse with the help of Ramon Berenguer IV, Count of Barcelona and prince of Aragon. Louis VII came to the aid of his brother-in-law Raymond V, Count of Toulouse. Henry II withdrew, annexing part of Quercy and Cahors.

Throughout the early 1160s, Henry II steadily increased his influence in the Duchy of Brittany until he forced Duke Conan IV to abdicate in favor of his daughter Constance, Duchess of Brittany whom Henry promptly married to his own son Geoffrey II, Duke of Brittany, placing the duchy firmly within the Angevin sphere of control. Henry II would rule Brittany until the children came of age and thereafter, indirectly, via subordinates. 

Although Henry II wielded much stronger authority within his lands and commanded far greater resources than his Capetian rivals, two cases tarnished his reign:

The conflict with former Chancellor Thomas Becket. The latter opposed the abolition of ecclesiastical privileges, including judicial, and the influence of the Church on the King of England. The Archbishop of Canterbury was assassinated in his cathedral in 1170 by knights who sought to please the king. Afterwards, Henry achieved a settlement with the Church which exculpated him of direct responsibility for Becket’s death and retained much of the royal authority he had imposed over ecclesiastical matters, albeit unofficially. 
The division of his considerable territories between his sons. Eager to inherit, his three eldest sons rebelled against him with the help of their mother, Eleanor of Aquitaine, the King of France, King William the Lion of Scotland, and the counts of Blois, Boulogne and Flanders. Henry emerged victorious and cemented his status in Western Europe. He imprisoned William the Lion in 1174 after his capture at the Battle of Alnwick who secured his freedom only after agreeing the Treaty of Falaise, which bound Scotland as a feudatory of the English crown. For her alleged part in the rebellion, his wife was also subjected to a long captivity.

Henry acquired considerable prestige and enjoyed a preeminent status amongst European monarchs for the remaining 15 years of his reign, maintaining a lavish and well-attended court with emissaries from across Europe competing for his time or seeking arbitration. The new King of France, Philip Augustus, was determined to fight Henry II, whose immense territories threatened the Capetian monarchy. The King of France allied with the surviving sons of Henry II, Richard and John Lackland. By the Treaty of Azay-le-Rideau on 4 July 1189, and ill-stricken Henry II had to recognize his son Richard as sole heir. He died only two days later in his castle of Chinon and was buried at the abbey of Fontevrault. Despite the treaty, Henry II had only really been humiliated personally and nothing had changed politically, with Richard succeeded to his father’s vast territories. The Angevins still commanded much more power and remained no less a threat to the Capetian monarchy.

Richard the Lionheart's war with Philip Augustus

When Philip Augustus came to the throne in 1180, he was the king of a territory comparable in area to the Île-de-France of today and faced against an Angevin Empire more powerful than ever. Having strengthened his position within his own kingdom, he began raising the sons of Henry II against their father, supporting their revolts and befriending Richard the Lionheart. After two years of combat (1186-1188), a truce was signed to maintain status quo. The death of Henry II in 1189 and the call for the Third Crusade put an end to the conflict, and Richard the Lionheart was crowned King of England in Westminster Abbey, and immediately left for the crusade alongside King Philip.

Returning early from the crusade in December 1191, Philip Augustus encouraged the rebellion of John Lackland against his brother Richard and profited from the absence of the latter to negotiate a very advantageous treaty for France. Hoping to acquire the English crown with the support of the King of France, John Lackland paid homage in 1193. Then, as Philip Augustus attacked the possessions of the Plantagenets, John gave to the French king eastern Normandy (except Rouen), Le Vaudreuil, Verneuil and Évreux, by written agreement, in January 1194. By his military and diplomatic finesse, Philip kept his rival at bay.
Richard the Lionheart continued the crusade after the departure of Philip: he retook the main Palestinian ports up to Jaffa, and restored the Latin Kingdom of Jerusalem although the city itself eluded him. He eventually negotiated a five-year truce with Saladin and sailed back in October 1192. Winter storms overtook him. Forced to stay at Corfu, he was captured by Duke Leopold V of Austria, who put him in the hands of the German Emperor Henry VI, his enemy. For the release of Richard, the emperor asked for a ransom of 100,000 marks, plus 50,000 marks to help him conquer Sicily.Richard was finally released on 2 February 1194. His mother, Eleanor of Aquitaine, paid two-thirds of the ransom, one hundred thousand marks, the balance to be paid later. His reaction was immediate. In the Battle of Fréteval, Richard was able to push back Philip. As a result, Philip gave up most of his recent conquests in the first treaty in January 1196. Then the fighting resumed in 1197, again to the advantage of Richard who invaded the Vexin, resulting in an English victory at the Battle of Gisors in which the saying and future motto of the United Kingdom "Dieu et mon droit" was supposedly uttered by king Richard, and has been used as a battle cry ever since. The two kings looked for support, while the new Pope Innocent III, who wanted to set up a new crusade, pushed them to negotiate. The situation ended abruptly. During the siege of the castle of Châlus (Limousin) in 1199, Richard was hit by a crossbow bolt. He succumbed to his injuries a few days later, on April 6, forty-one years old and at the height of his glory.

The maneuvers of Philip Augustus 

John Lackland succeeded his brother Richard. The succession was not unopposed: facing John was his nephew, the young Arthur of Brittany (12 years old), son of his elder brother Geoffrey, Duke of Brittany who died in 1186. Philip Augustus supported this rivalry, and while he had taken the position of John against Richard, this time he took the position of Arthur against John. Philip received the homage of Arthur, as Duke of Brittany, in spring 1199 for the counties of Anjou, Maine and Touraine. This allowed him to negotiate from a position of strength with John Lackland; thus the Treaty of Le Goulet was created in 1200 which aimed to settle the claims the Angevin kings of England had on French lands, with the exception of Aquitaine, in order to end the constant dispute over Normandy. The treaty was sealed by the marriage of Louis of France and Blanche of Castile, John's niece.

However, the hostilities did not cease. Philip again took the cause of Arthur, and summoned John his vassal under the Treaty of Le Goulet for his actions in Aquitaine and Tours. John, naturally, did not present himself, and the court of France pronounced the confiscation of his fiefs.

In the spring of 1202 Philip attacked Normandy while Arthur attacked Poitou, but the young duke was surprised by King John in the Battle of Mirebeau, and taken prisoner with his troops as well as his sister Eleanor, Fair Maid of Brittany. Arthur of Brittany disappeared in the following months, probably murdered in early 1203. Philip then provided support to vassals of Arthur and resumed his actions in Normandy in spring 1203. Philip ordered Eleanor be released, which John eventually refused. Philip dismantled the system of Norman castles, took Le Vaudreuil, and began the Siege of Chateau Gaillard in September 1203. Meanwhile, John made the mistake of leaving Normandy to go to England in December 1203. Chateau Gaillard fell 6 March 1204.

Normandy was now open for the taking. Philip pressed his advantage; Falaise, Caen, Bayeux, and Rouen surrendered 24 June 1204, despairing the aid of John Lackland, who did not come. Arques and Verneuil fell immediately after, completing the success of Philip, who had conquered Normandy in two years of campaign. To consolidate his new conquest, Philip Augustus built the castle of Rouen, an imposing fortress of Philippian style and the locus of Capetian power in Normandy.

Philip then turned to the Loire Valley, where he took Poitiers in August 1204, and Loches and Chinon in 1205. John and Philip finally agreed to a truce in Thouars, on 13 October 1206. For Philip Augustus, it was then necessary to stabilize these rapid conquests. Since 1204, Philip published an order imposing the use of Norman, instead of Angevin, currency.

From 1206 to 1212, Philip Augustus strove to strengthen his territorial conquests. Capetian domination was accepted in Champagne, Brittany, and Auvergne, but the counties of Boulogne and Flanders remain reluctant.

Renaud de Dammartin, Count of Boulogne, became a primary concern. Despite the favors of Philip Augustus, who married in 1210 his son Philip Hurepel to Matilda, daughter of Renaud, he continued to negotiate with the enemy camp. The suspicions of Philip took shape when the count began to fortify Mortain, in western Normandy. In 1211, Philip went on the offensive, taking Mortain, Aumale and Dammartin. Renaud de Dammartin fled to the county of Bar, and was no longer an immediate threat.

The success of Philip Augustus

The incredible success of Philip Augustus soon brought all of his rivals to unite against him. The opposition formed in 1212. John allied with his nephew, Otto IV, Holy Roman Emperor, who was currently facing an internal crisis within the Empire in which the French supported Otto's opposition, Philip of Swabia. Renaud de Dammartin was the real architect of the coalition. He had nothing to lose when he went to Frankfurt to seek the support of Otto and England, where he paid homage to John. Hostilities between Philip and John resumed immediately.

At the same time, the first operations of the Albigensian Crusade, led by French barons, saw the quarrel between the Raymond VI, Count of Toulouse and the Crusaders. Philip Augustus refused to intervene and focused on the English danger. He gathered his barons in Soissons on April 8, 1213, ordering his son Louis to lead the expedition against England and won the support of all his vassals, except one, Ferdinand, Count of Flanders, whom he himself had installed two years earlier. Philip then sought further support, particularly with Henry I, Duke of Brabant. After some hesitation, Pope Innocent III on the other hand chose to support John, which provided moral support, but no direct military advantage. The preparations of the conflict persisted: the initial project of Philip, who wanted to invade England, was thwarted when his fleet was attacked by the enemy coalition at Damme in May 1213. The following month saw Philip and Louis strive against the counties of Boulogne and Flanders. The northern cities were almost all devastated.

In February 1214, John finally arrived on the continent, in La Rochelle, hoping to take Philip unawares. The strategy worked at first, since John won supporters among the barons of Limousin and Poitou. In May 1214, he returned to the Loire Valley and took Angers. Philip, already engaged with the combined coalition force of English, Flemish, and German forces in Flanders, ordered his son Louis to head west and fight John who was currently besieging Roche-au-Moine. Although John had outmaneuvered the Prince and thus forced him to give battle when John had a clear numerical advantage, the support of Poitevin and Angevin barons vacillated and they forced the king to retreat for unknown reasons; however, due to the military culture and the concept of chivalry at the time, this was not uncommon. It is not clear if the remaining mercenaries under John's leadership ever engaged the enemy. The king of England fled on July 2; the English defeat was total. But the coalition was not yet lost: everything depended on the eastern theatre of the war.

The final confrontation between the armies of Philip and the coalition led by Otto, was now inevitable, after several weeks of approach and avoidance. On Sunday, July 27, 1214, the army of Philip, pursued by the coalition, arrived at Bouvines to cross the bridge over the Marque. At that Sunday, the prohibition to fight is absolute for Christians, but Otto decides to go on with the offensive, hoping to surprise the enemy while crossing the bridge. Philip's army was greatly surprised from the rear, but he quickly reorganized his troops before they could be engaged on the bridge. They quickly turned against the coalition. The French right wing fought against the Flemish knights, led by Ferdinand. At the center where fiercest of the fighting occurred, Philip and Otto fought in person. In the cavalry melee, Philip was unseated, and he fell, but his knights protected him, offered him a fresh horse, and the king resumed the assault until Otto ordered a retreat. Finally, on the left, the supporters of Philip ended the career of Renaud de Dammartin who was leading the knights from Brabant, as well as William Longespée who led the English knights, both of whom were captured by the French after a long resistance. Fate had turned in favor of Philip, despite the numerical inferiority of his troops. The victory was decisive: the Emperor fled, Philip's men captured 130 prisoners, including five counts, including the reviled traitor, Renaud of Dammartin, and the Count of Flanders, Ferdinand.

The coalition was dissolved after its defeat. On September 18, 1214, in Chinon, Philip signed a truce for five years. The English king returned to England in 1214. By the Treaty of Chinon, John Lackland abandoned all his possessions to the north of the Loire: Berry, Touraine, Maine and Anjou returned to the royal domain, which then covered a third of France, greatly enlarged and free from external threat.

John acknowledged Alix as duchess of Brittany and gave up the claim of Eleanor, who would end up in prison in 1241.

Prince Louis' expedition to England

The victory was complete on the continent, but Philip's ambitions did not stop there. Indeed, Philip Augustus wanted to go further against John of England. He thus argues that John should be deprived of the throne, recalling his betrayal of Richard in 1194, and the murder of his nephew Arthur. Arguing a questionable interpretation also of the genealogy of his wife Blanche of Castile, Louis, at the request of the English barons in rebellion, led an expedition to attempt the conquest of England. The landing took place in May 1216 and Louis, at the head of numerous troops (1,200 knights, plus many anglais rebels), conquered the English kingdom, including London, where he settled and proclaimed himself as King of England. Only Windsor, Lincoln and Dover resisted. But despite the warm welcome to Louis by a majority of English bishops, the support of the pope to John remained firm, and Louis was excommunicated. Finally, John died suddenly of illness, October 19, 1216. The former allies of John then hastily crowned his son Henry III, aged nine. Pope Innocent III also just died, but his successor Pope Honorius III continued to defend the loyalists. The bishops soon withdrew their support from Louis and the rebels. The prince returned to seek support in France beginning in 1217 and returned to England. This time, his forces were routed by the English who were led by William Marshal in the decisive Battle of Lincoln. The French attempted to send reinforcements and supplies across the English Channel, but were obliterated in another decisive battle in the Battle of Sandwich. Louis agreed to negotiate peace in June; it was completed in September 1217 and his excommunication was lifted.

The attitude of Philip Augustus towards this expedition was ambiguous; he did not officially support it and even criticized his son's strategy for the conquest of England, but it is unlikely that he had not given his consent to it, at least privately.

After Bouvines, military operations took place in England or the southern France. The royal domain and the vast area north of the Loire enjoyed repose under the terms of the truce concluded in Chinon in 1215; originally for five years and then extended in 1220 with the guarantee of Louis, an association which marked the beginning of Philip's transition to his son and heir.

If the conquests by arms ceased, Philip nevertheless extended his influence by taking advantage of problematic cases of inheritance. This was the case in Champagne on the accession of Theobald IV, which allowed him to reestablish his suzerainty. This was the case especially when the king recovered certain lands such as Issoudun, Bully, Alençon, Clermont-en-Beauvaisis and Ponthieu.

The prosperity of the kingdom at the end of the reign of Philip Augustus is an established fact. It is estimated the annual surplus of the treasury was 25,210 livres in November 1221. On that date, the Treasury had in its coffers 157,036 livres, more than 80% of the total ordinary annual income of the monarchy. The testament of Philip Augustus, written in September 1222, confirms these figures, since the sum of its legacy amounted to 790,000 livres of Paris, nearly four years of revenue. This will was written while Philip was in a poor state of health and feared death. It will eventually occur ten months later.

While he was in Pacy, Philip decided to attend an ecclesiastical assembly in Paris to prepare for a new crusade against the advice of his doctors. He did not survive the fatigue of travel and died on July 14, 1223, at Mantes. His body was brought to Paris, and his funeral was quickly organized, in Saint-Denis, in the presence of the great men of the kingdom. For the first time, the body of the King of France dressed in all the regalia is exposed for the veneration of the people before his burial in a solemn rite based on that of the kings of England.

The conquests of Louis VIII in France

Nicknamed the "Lion", it was during the reign of his father that Louis won his fame by winning over John Lackland the victory of La Roche-aux-Moines in 1214. During his expedition across the Channel, Louis VIII was defeated at Lincoln in May 1217, and renounced his claims to the throne of England by the Treaty of Lambeth on September 11, 1217, while getting in return a large sum of money.

Louis VIII later claimed that the English court had not fulfilled all the conditions of the treaty of 1217. Taking advantage of the minority of Henry III, he decided to seize the last English possessions in France.

Aquitaine was taken, the cities of the region falling one after the other: Poitou, Saintonge, Périgord, Angoumois, and part of Bordeaux. Louis VIII seized all territory as far as the Garonne, in a quick campaign. To control the trade of the region, the French laid siege to the strategic port city of La Rochelle in 1224, and after a few military confrontations between the English garrison and Louis' forces, the city surrendered within a month. The remaining possessions held by the English king were Bordeaux and Gascony.

The reign of Saint Louis

In 1230 the King Henry III of England led an expedition to France to reclaim the Plantagenet heritage but was repelled and forced to re-embark for his kingdom the following year. In 1242, Henry was again at war with the King of France Louis IX as he took advantage of the inheritance dispute in the County of Poitou. However, he was defeated in two battles that were fought within 2 days of each other, the Battle of Taillebourg at Taillebourg and a more decisive battle near Saintes, just south of the original battle. Louis pressed his advantage and laid siege to the city of Saintes. Though it is unclear that any armed conflict happened in the siege, it brought an end to the short-lived Saintonge war.

As a result of Henry's military failures in France and the constant demand to finance his wars, the barons of England sought to reassert the authority of the Magna Carta which the king had been overstepping for decades. As tensions between loyalists and rebels grew and the possibility of a Second Barons War seemed a very real possibility, naturally, both sides requested the support of the King of France. Seeking to restore his position in a seemingly desperate situation, in 1259 Henry purchased the support of Louis by the Treaty of Paris, agreeing to accept the loss of the lands in France that had been seized from him and from his father King John by Louis and his predecessors since 1202, and to do homage for those that remained in his hands. The treaty put an end to Henry's and any future king of England's ambitions to reestablish the former Angevin Empire; however, an underlying rivalry would remain. Following the treaty, the two kingdoms generally enjoyed a period of peace and stable relations; the English kings would regularly pay homage to the King of France. Each kingdom used the time to invade its smaller neighbors in the First War of Scottish Independence in the case of England and the Franco-Flemish war in the case of France.

Final settlement under Philip the Fair

The first Hundred Years' War is ended definitively with the Treaty of Montreuil-sur-Mer, ratified June 19, 1299 by Philip IV the Fair and Edward I of England. It restored Guyenne to the King of England, but provided for the double marriage of Margaret, Philip's sister, to Edward, and Isabella, Philip's daughter, to Edward's son, also named Edward. On May 20, 1303, France and England signed the Treaty of Paris (1303) which confirmed the provisions of the Treaty of Montreuil.

Ironically, Edward III, the son of Isabella and Edward II of England would use his position as grandson of Philip the Fair to claim the Kingdom of France. Therefore, the marriage settlement that sealed the end of the "first" Hundred Years' War would lead to the casus belli employed to declare the "second" Hundred Years' War. The War of Saint-Sardos, the first major conflict between the two major kingdoms in half a century, would act as foreshadowing for the bigger war to come.

Bibliography
Anne-Marie Flambard Héricher and Véronique Gazeau, 1204, La Normandie entre Plantagenêts et Capétiens, Caen, CRAHM, 2007

Notes and references

See also
The second Hundred Years' War
War of the Roses

12th-century conflicts
13th-century conflicts
12th century in England
13th century in England
12th century in France
13th century in France
Anglo-French wars
Capetian dynasty
Geopolitical rivalry
House of Plantagenet
Warfare of the Middle Ages
Wars involving England
Wars involving France